Gustav Gunsenheimer (born 10 March 1934) is a German director of church music and a composer of mostly sacred music and chamber music. First an elementary school teacher, he worked for decades as the church musician at St. Lukas in Schweinfurt, where he held annual festivals, conducted a notable choir, was responsible in the Bavarian organization of chorale conductors, and was a lecturer at the music university of Würzburg.

Career 
Born in Kunzendorf, Gunsenheimer left Silesia with his family at the end of World War II. He attended a gymnasium with a focus on old languages in Bamberg, completed with the Abitur in 1954. He studied to be a music teacher at schools. He taught at elementary schools, from 1956 in Bad Königshofen, from 1968 in Schweinfurt.

His career as a musician began when he founded and conducted a regional teachers' choir named "Fränkischer Singkreis" (Franconian singing circle). In 1966 the state of Bavaria granted him a scholarship to study for two years at the Mozarteum in Salzburg. His studies included "Elementare Musik- und Bewegungserziehung" (Elementary music and movement pedagogy), which brought him in personal contact with Carl Orff.

He returned to Schweinfurt in 1968 and led the oratorio choir "Liederkranz Schweinfurt". From 1969 he was the church musician at St. Lukas. He initiated there in 1970 an annual festival "Musiktage am Hochfeld" (Music days at the Hochfeld, the location of the church), also another regular festival "Musik um die Osterzeit" (Music for Eastertide). For these concerts, he was able to attract musicians who would not normally play at a small church, such as the Bamberger Streichquartett (Bamberg String Quartet), the violinist Wolfgang Forchert, soloists at the beginning of their career such as soprano Barbara Schlick, contralto Waltraud Meier, tenor Christoph Prégardien, and the guitarist Michael Tröster. He grouped the music around themes, such as anniversaries of composers. In 2013, the programs were focused on music on texts by Friedrich Rückert, to commemorate his 150th anniversary of death.

Gunsenheimer succeeded Karl Thomas after his death in 1973 as conductor of the annual Chorleiterwoche im Landesverband Evangelischer Kirchenchöre, a week of meetings and music for Bavarian Protestant chorale conductors). He had a position as lecturer at the Fachhochschule Würzburg, later also at the Musikhochschule Würzburg in music therapy. He was responsible for the church music at St. Lukas until the first Sunday in Advent of 2015.

In 1983 he was honoured with the title Kirchenmusikdirektor (director of church music with regional responsibility). In 1987 he was awarded the Stadtmedaille Schweinfurt, and on 12 December 1989 the Cross of the Order of Merit.

Selected compositions 
Gunsenheimer composed cantatas, motets, music for brass ensemble, organ and orchestra. His compositions relate to traditional models, and can be performed by amateurs.
 Auf meinen lieben Gott, chorale preludes for organ or harpsichord, on "Auf meinen lieben Gott"
 Lobe den Herren, suite for soprano recorder and organ
 Drei Intraden (Three Intradas) for brass
 Benedicamus Domino, six European Christmas carols in the original language and translation for mixed choir a cappella
 Vater unser, (Lord's Prayer) for four-part men's choir a cappella
 Die Versuchung Jesu, Evangelienmotette (1968), published by Carus-Verlag in 1968
 Lob, Ehr' und Preis, partita for winds (organ ad lib.) in four movements to "Nun danket alle Gott"
 Sonata No. 2 for solo and continuo, published by Vogt & Fritz, Schweinfurt
 Sonatina for organ
 Der Sonnengesang des Franz von Assisi

References

External links 
 Gustav Gunsenheimer / Kirchenmusikdirektor (em.) (in German) 
 Gunsenheimer, Gustav in German) komponistenarchiv.de
 Gunsenheimer, Gustav 
 Gustav Gunsenheimer / 1934 Carus-Verlag
 Siegfried Bergler: Verabschiedung von KMD Gustav Gunsenheimer (in German) Evangelisch-Lutherisches Dekanat Schweinfurt 29 November 2015

20th-century classical composers
Sacred music composers
German choral conductors
German male conductors (music)
Recipients of the Cross of the Order of Merit of the Federal Republic of Germany
1934 births
Living people
20th-century German conductors (music)
21st-century German conductors (music)
20th-century German male musicians
21st-century German male musicians
Kirchenmusikdirektor